Steven Pinto-Borges (born 26 March 1986) is a former professional footballer who played as an attacking midfielder. Born in France, he is a former youth international for Portugal.

Club career
Born in Vitry-sur-Seine, Pinto-Borges played at youth level with US Villejuif and Créteil before joining the training centre at Guingamp. He signed professional terms with the club, and made his debut in the Ligue 2 game against Amiens on 11 November 2005. His first senior goal came on the last day of the 2007–08 Ligue 2 season, in the clubs 5–0 win against Troyes.

At the end of this Guingamp contract in the summer of 2009, Pinto-Borges signed for Clermont. He spent two seasons at the club, followed by two seasons in the Championnat National with Cherbourg and a season with Carquefou. In the summer of 2014 he signed for Grenoble in the fourth tier. During four seasons with the club they obtained back-to-back promotions to Ligue 2, but he left in the summer of 2018 without playing at the higher level again.

In June 2018 Pinto-Borges signed a one-year contract, with option to extend, with Belgian First Division B side Union Saint-Gilloise. He left in the summer 2019, after one season, returning to France with Annecy.

International career
Pinto-Borges was born in France and is of Portuguese descent, and represented the Portugal U20s at the 2007 Toulon Tournament.

References

External links
 
 
 Steven Pinto Borges at FootNational
 
 

1986 births
Living people
People from Vitry-sur-Seine
Footballers from Val-de-Marne
Association football midfielders
Portuguese footballers
Portugal youth international footballers
French footballers
French expatriate footballers
French people of Portuguese descent
En Avant Guingamp players
Clermont Foot players
AS Cherbourg Football players
USJA Carquefou players
Grenoble Foot 38 players
Royale Union Saint-Gilloise players
FC Annecy players
Ligue 2 players
Championnat National players
Championnat National 2 players
Challenger Pro League players
French expatriate sportspeople in Belgium
Expatriate footballers in Belgium